The Voice Kids is a Philippine reality singing television competition on ABS-CBN. It premiered on May 24, 2014, replacing Bet on Your Baby. A spinoff of The Voice of the Philippines, the series, like its parent show, is based on the original The Voice of Holland, and is part of the wider The Voice franchise. It aims to feature young aspiring singers aged 6–12. It is the fourth national franchise in the Southeast Asian region to produce a kids' edition of the show, after Thailand and Vietnam. Since its inaugural season, it has aired a total of four seasons. The winners of the four seasons were: Lyca Gairanod, Elha Nympha, Joshua Oliveros, and Vanjoss Bayaban.

The series employs a panel of three coaches who critique the artists' performances and guide their teams of selected artists through the remainder of the series. The original coaches of the show is composed of Lea Salonga, Bamboo Mañalac, and Sarah Geronimo. The panel for the fifth season includes Mañalac, Martin Nievera, and KZ Tandingan.

After the third season ended, the show was put on hold to make room for The Voice Teens. The fourth season premiered on August 3, 2019. On November 14, 2022, it was announced that The Voice Kids will be renewed for a fifth season; auditions were held throughout the Philippines in late 2022.

Overview
The series is part of franchise and is based on a similar competition format in the Netherlands with the same name.

Format
The Voice Kids is a reality television series that started from a format originating from the Netherlands with the same, which was a spin-off of the main series The Voice of Holland. The whole format features three coaches or judges searching for a batch of talented new kids, who could become the Philippines' new child singing superstar. The show's concept is indicated by its title: The three coaches will only judge a singer hopeful termed by the show as "Artist" with only his/her vocal talent without prejudice to his/her physical bearing.

It is this concept that makes The Voice franchise rise above other known reality talent searches which airs in any known media platform such as The X Factor franchise, the Got Talent franchise, or even the Idol franchise. The lucky Artists who have advanced from the audition round would be split into three teams, whom are mentored by three well-known personalities in terms of singing which in the show, termed "coaches" who in turn would collaborate with them and choose songs for their artists to perform. Only kids ages eight to fourteen years-old can participate.

There are five known different stages: Producers' auditions, Blind auditions, the Battles, the Sing-offs, and the Live shows.

On-ground and the Producers' auditions
As for any The Voice franchise the first stage is the producers' auditions, which are not shown on television. In the Voice of the Philippines, ABS-CBN headed by their regional partners nationwide and abroad are tasked to conduct the "Unseen Auditions." At this stage, there will be different judges that will use the power of media to on-ground auditions where the team will travel in and out of the country to find the best of the best to participate in the next set of auditions, "The Blind Auditions."

Blind auditions
The first televised stage is the blind auditions, where artists will be given a minimum of ninety seconds to sing their audition piece. The official coaches of the show will be sitting on a chair facing away from the stage and artist. The coaches will only judge by the power, clarity, type and uniqueness of the artists singing capability. If they like what they hear and want to mentor the artist for the next stage, they will push a button on their chair that would turn the chair around to face the artists for the first time. This concept was created to avoid any due prejudice of their physical bearing and life-story. If a coach turns for an artist, that artist will be included in his/her team. If more than one coach turns around, the choice to pick a who will he/she be mentored goes to the artist. If no coach turns his/her chair the auditioning artist's journey ends. At the end, each of the coach will have a certain number of artists in his or her team (18 in the first two seasons and the fifth season, 24 in the third season). who will be advancing to the next round. In the fourth season, each coach can have an unlimited number of artists in their teams.

The Battles
The second stage called "The Battles," is where a coach will build his team for "The Sing-offs". A coach will group his artists into groups of three. Per group, they will be given a single song to sing together. They are mentored and developed by their respective coach in the process. A vocal showdown will commence in the Battle stage where only the artist whom the coach deemed sung the song assigned better will advance to the next round. Steals were added in the fourth season, where each coach can steal one losing artist from other teams.

The Sing-offs
The third stage called "The Sing-offs," is a recently added round in the local franchise. It is similar to "The Sing-offs" of The Voice Kids of the Netherlands where each coach will pick only a certain number of artists (2 in the first two seasons and 3 in the third season) in order to advance to the semi-finals.

Live shows
After "the Sing-offs", the artists will go directly to the Live shows, which will also be the semifinal round. Only an elite group of finalists (4 in the first two seasons and 3 in the third season) voted by the public will advance to the finals.

Development

On November 18, 2013, Lauren Dyogi, the franchise's business unit head, announced on Twitter that there will be a kids version of The Voice of the Philippines. The franchise was launched after the success of the first season of the main version which had garnered high ratings and was trending topic online. Auditions schedule were later announced in the same month.

On March 9, 2014, the show released its first teaser. On March 17, 2014, the production team of the program started to provide updates of the filming of the Blind auditions, posting teasers of the new improved set and chairs and of the coaches in the show's official social media accounts. A second teaser was aired on April 2, 2014.

A new season was announced last February 18, 2015.

Auditions
The first open call auditions was held on November 23, 2013, at Metro Gaisano Pacific Mall in Mandaue, Cebu and was open to kids aged 8 to 14 years old. It was followed by an audition held on December 1, 2013, at the Newport Mall in Resorts World Manila. In 2014, auditions for the Visayas, Mindanao, and Metro Manila were held on January 11, 18, and 25 respectively. A separate audition for Luzon was held on February 1.

The auditions for the second season will be held on March 7, 2015, at the Araneta Coliseum in Quezon City. Other auditions will be held at several key cities on a yet to be announced dates. For this season, the age of the auditionees were reduced to aged 7 to 13 from the previous season's aged 8 to 14.

Filming and set locations
In an article Lea Salonga wrote in Philippine Daily Inquirer and was published on January 16, 2014, she said the blind auditions will be filmed by March. On March 15, 2014, Sarah Geronimo, in an interview by Jocelyn Dimaculangan from the Philippine Entertainment Portal, revealed that the first day of Blind auditions was filmed on March 17, 2014. The entire Blind auditions was filmed until March 20, 2014, at Studio 10 of ABS-CBN Broadcasting Center in Quezon City, Metro Manila. The Battles and the Sing-offs were also filmed in Studio 10 from June 23 to 25, 2014.

The Live shows were held in Newport Performing Arts Theater, Resorts World Manila, Newport City, Pasay.

Coaches

There were rumors that an unnamed Filipino singer who is popular in Asia, and a Filipina singer who is known for winning an international reality singing competition will sit as coaches for this series. Ending the rumors, Lea Salonga herself confirmed that she will be part of the kids version. She also confirmed that Sarah Geronimo and Bamboo Mañalac will also sit as coaches in the show. The three coaches will return for the second season.

On March 19, 2016, Salonga confirmed that she and Manalac will return as coaches for the third season; however, she could not confirm if Geronimo will return to the show. On April 4, 2016, Geronimo confirmed that she will not be returning for the third season; however she is still open to coach in the future seasons. On May 2, 2016, Sharon Cuneta confirmed that she will be the new coach on the upcoming third season of The Voice Kids. On December 19, 2022, during ABS-CBN's 2022 Christmas Special, it was revealed that KZ Tandingan and Martin Nievera would replace Geronimo and Salonga for the fifth season of the show.

Current

Bamboo Mañalac

On March 7, 2014, Salonga confirmed on his Twitter that Bamboo Mañalac will be part of the kids version of the show. In an interview, Bamboo admitted that coaching kids in this version will be difficult, but see it as a challenging thing to do. He also said that, "With adults, you already know where they're headed as an artist. With kids, it's still a gray area. So I carefully listen to every child so I can give justice to their performance when I comment, whether I turn around or not."

KZ Tandingan 
On December 18, 2022, Tandingan was revealed to be one of the coaches for the fifth season.

Martin Nievera 
On December 18, 2022, Nievera was revealed to be one of the coaches for the fifth season.

Former

Sharon Cuneta

On May 2, 2016, Sharon Cuneta confirmed through an interview on TV Patrol that she will be the new coach in the third season of The Voice Kids.

In 2019, it was confirmed that Cuneta will not return for the fourth season.

Sarah Geronimo

On March 7, 2014, Salonga confirmed on her Twitter that Sarah Geronimo will be part of the kids version of the show. In an interview by Nerisa Almo of the Philippine Entertainment Portal, Geronimo shared and described her experience in the Blind auditions of The Voice Kids. She said that there were times that kids will cry for not being chosen in the Blind auditions and they had to control their criticisms.

On April 4, 2016, Geronimo confirmed that she will not be returning as a coach for the third season. In an interview by ABS-CBN News, Geronimo said that she wanted to return to ASAP, ABS-CBN's musical variety show, and that she felt that coaching in the show feels like a role-playing task. However, she further confirmed that she is open to return as a coach in the show's future seasons. On May 2, 2016, Sharon Cuneta was confirmed to replace Geronimo in the third season of The Voice Kids.

On June 2, 2019, Sarah Geronimo confirmed that she will be returning as a coach for the fourth season.

Lea Salonga

On January 15, 2014, interview by Push, Lea Salonga confirmed herself that she will be part of the show. She said that she was happy to join the kids version of The Voice of the Philippines. She also said, "I'm doing it, I can't say 'we' because I don't know. You'll have to ask Bamboo and Sarah (Geronimo) if they also said yes, but I said yes na. So we're just kind of fine tuning it. Kasi even in the franchises abroad like the Netherlands and Korea, they chose the same people who do the adults and kids. But there's just going to be three coaches. It's a shorter season. With the adults, it's the same as last year. And we're going to start ramping up. It's exciting and I've been getting texts form the staff who are auditioning people for this year, they're all like telling me, 'Maloloka ka, maloloka ka sa galing ng mga nag-o-audition. I think you'll find it even better than last year.' I feel like my cup runneth over! (laughs) So it's exciting to think about. I can't wait to start. It'll be fun. It will be a good time."

Hosts
On February 10, 2014, interview of Banana Nite, Toni Gonzaga confirmed that she will not be hosting the kids version. On March 11, 2014, a rumor was circulating online that Luis Manzano and Alex Gonzaga will be hosting the show. By March 14, the rumor was becoming more stronger as The Voice Kids team published a teaser, through the franchise's official Instagram, of an image of two silhouette individuals described as the hosts of the show. Few netizens commented that the silhouette figures highly resembled those of Luis Manzano and Alex Gonzaga. On March 17, 2014, it was confirmed by the official PR website of ABS-CBN that the show will be hosted by Luis Manzano and Alex Gonzaga.

The second season of the show is hosted again by Manzano. He will be joined by two new hosts: Robi Domingo (who previously co-hosted with Manzano in the second season of the adult version) and Yeng Constantino. Both replaced Gonzaga as the backstage and social media hosts.

For the show's third season, Kim Chiu replaces Yeng Constantino due to the latter being focused as a judge and mentor in two other singing competitions: Tawag ng Tanghalan and We Love OPM. This was further confirmed via a commercial that aired on May 20, 2016.

On the fourth season of the show, Toni Gonzaga replaced Luis Manzano as its new host due to that he returned as the host of the second season of I Can See Your Voice. Robi Domingo returned as its backstage host. Kim Chiu did not return as its backstage host due to that she will have a new teleserye Love Thy Woman. KaladKaren and Jeremy Glinoga hosted the online companion show during the fourth season, which airs concurrently to the main show.

On the fifth season, it was announced on the press that only Robi Domingo will remain as host. Bianca Gonzalez will replace Toni Gonzaga as its new host. Jeremy Glinoga returned as the online host for this season with second  season grand champion Elha Nympha replacing KaladKaren.

Coaches and hosts

Coaches

Hosts

 Legend
 Featured as a TV host.
 Featured as an backstage host.
 Featured as an online host.
 Featured as a contestant.

Season summary
Warning: the following table presents a significant amount of different colors.

  Team Lea (FamiLea)
  Team Bamboo (Kamp Kawayan)
  Team Sarah
  Team Sharon
  Team KZ (Team Supreme)
  Team Martin (MarTeam)

Teams 
Contestant placing

Reception

Television ratings
From the accumulated data report gathered by Kantar Media in January to December 2014, the first season of the franchise was the most watched television program in the entire year with an average television viewership rating of 34.5%. It even beat the second season of the adult's version which only gained an average television viewership rating of 27.5% and ranked sixth out of twenty. Meanwhile, from AGB Nielsen's data, the first season's July 26 episode was the sixth most watched episode in the entire year and tied with Got to Believe'''s March 6 episode with both programs earned a 31.8% rating. In 2015, the second season of the franchise was the most watched television program in the entire year, having garnered an average television viewership rating of 41.7%.

Television ratings for The Voice of the Philippines'' on ABS-CBN come from two major sources, namely from AGB Nielsen and Kantar Media. AGB Nielsen's survey ratings were gathered from Mega Manila households, while Kantar Media's survey ratings were gathered from all over the Philippines' urban and rural households.

Awards
Since the show's inception, it had received numerous nominations and awards from different award giving bodies.

See also
 List of programs broadcast by ABS-CBN
 List of programs broadcast by Kapamilya Channel
 List of programs broadcast by Kapamilya Online Live
 List of programs broadcast by A2Z

References

External links
 The Voice Kids on ABS-CBN

 
The Voice of the Philippines
ABS-CBN original programming
Philippine reality television series
2014 Philippine television series debuts
2010s Philippine television series
2020s Philippine television series
Filipino-language television shows
Television series about children